Ellen Lily Watson (born 10 March 2000) is a Scottish cricketer who plays as a right-handed batter and wicket-keeper. In July 2018, she was named in Scotland's squad for the 2018 ICC Women's World Twenty20 Qualifier tournament.

In August 2019, she was named in Scotland's squad for the 2019 Netherlands Women's Quadrangular Series. She made her WT20I debut for Scotland, against the Netherlands, on 9 August 2019. Later the same month, she was named in Scotland's squad for the 2019 ICC Women's World Twenty20 Qualifier tournament in Scotland. In January 2022, she was named in Scotland's squad for the 2022 Commonwealth Games Cricket Qualifier in Malaysia.

She played four matches in the 2019 Women's County Championship for Berkshire, scoring 13 runs in three innings.

References

External links
 
 

2000 births
Living people
Sportspeople from Irvine, North Ayrshire
Scottish women cricketers
Scotland women Twenty20 International cricketers
Berkshire women cricketers